Three Smart Saps is a 1942 short subject directed by Jules White starring American slapstick comedy team The Three Stooges (Moe Howard, Larry Fine and Curly Howard). It is the 64th entry in the series released by Columbia Pictures starring the comedians, who released 190 shorts for the studio between 1934 and 1959.

Plot 
The Stooges must get their future father-in-law (John Tyrrell) out of jail. Apparently, the father is a prison warden who has been overthrown and put behind bars by the local mafia. The Stooges manage to sneak into the prison, find the father-in-law to be, and start snapping as many incriminating photos of the mafia's party as possible. As a result, the real crooks are served justice, Williams is readmitted as warden and the Stooges marry their sweethearts.

Production notes 
Three Smart Saps was filmed on April 7–10, 1942. This is the seventh of sixteen Stooge shorts with the word "three" in the title. The film's title is a play on the 1936 musical comedy film Three Smart Girls.

The mobster party in prison is decorated with college-sports-style banners for Alcatraz, Joliet, Leavenworth and Sing Sing, all well-known prisons of the day.

The scene featuring Curly's loosely basted suit that comes apart at the seams while he is on the dance floor was a routine borrowed from Harold Lloyd's 1925 film The Freshman.

References

External links 
 
 

1942 films
The Three Stooges films
American black-and-white films
Films directed by Jules White
1942 comedy films
Columbia Pictures short films
American slapstick comedy films
1940s English-language films
1940s American films